The Comoro rousette (Rousettus obliviosus) is a species of megabat in the family Pteropodidae endemic to the Comoros Islands.  Its natural habitats are subtropical or tropical moist lowland forests, caves, plantations, and urban areas.

References

Mammals of the Comoros
Rousettus
Endemic fauna of the Comoros
Mammals described in 1978
Taxonomy articles created by Polbot
Bats of Africa